I Need You is a 1944 German comedy film directed by Hans Schweikart and starring Marianne Hoppe, Willy Birgel and Paul Dahlke. The film's sets were designed by the art director Hans Sohnle.

Synopsis
A conductor and his actress wife enjoy a stormy relationship due to their clashing working commitments.

Cast
 Marianne Hoppe as Julia Bach
 Willy Birgel as Prof. Paulus Allmann
 Paul Dahlke as Direktor Heinrich Scholz
 Fita Benkhoff as Hedi Scholz
 Ernst Fritz Fürbringer as Dr. Max Hoffmann
 Erna Sellmer as Julias Hausmädchen Emilie
 Joseph Offenbach as Dr. Wilberg

References

Bibliography 
 Hake, Sabine. Popular Cinema of the Third Reich. University of Texas Press, 2001.

External links 
 

1944 films
Films of Nazi Germany
German comedy films
1944 comedy films
1940s German-language films
Films directed by Hans Schweikart
German black-and-white films
Bavaria Film films
1940s German films